The Texas Medical Board (TMB) is the state agency mandated to regulate the practice of medicine by Doctors of Medicine (MDs) and Doctors of Osteopathic Medicine (DOs) in Texas. The Board consists of 12 physician members and seven public members appointed for a six-year term by the Governor and confirmed by the Senate. The full Board is required to meet at least four times a year but customarily convenes five times a year. Typical Board business includes interviewing licensure candidates, considering disciplinary matters and adopting substantive and procedural rules. Additionally, Board committees address a variety of important issues.

The Board also regulates as the Texas Physician Assistant Board, and as the Texas State Board of Acupuncture Examiners, and governs radiologic technologists and NPOs, among other health care practices. TMB is a member of the Federation of State Medical Boards.

The current president of the Texas Medical Board is Sherif Zaafran, M.D. It is headquartered in the William P. Hobby State Office Building in Austin, Texas.

References

External links
 Official website

State agencies of Texas
Texas